Fucoxanthin is a xanthophyll, with formula C42H58O6.  It is found as an accessory pigment in the chloroplasts of brown algae and most other heterokonts, giving them a brown or olive-green color. Fucoxanthin absorbs light primarily in the blue-green to yellow-green part of the visible spectrum, peaking at around 510-525 nm by various estimates and absorbing significantly in the range of 450 to 540 nm.

Function 
Carotenoids are pigments produced by plants and algae and play a role in light harvesting as part of the photosynthesis process. Xanthophylls are a subset of carotenoids, identified by the fact that they are oxygenated either as hydroxyl groups or as epoxide bridges. This makes them more water soluble than carotenes such as beta-carotene. Fucoxanthin is a xanthophyll that contributes more than 10% of the estimated total production of carotenoids in nature. It is an accessory pigment found in the chloroplasts of many brown macroalgae, such as Fucus spp., and the golden-brown unicellular microalgae, the diatoms. It absorbs blue and green light at bandwidth 450-540 nm, imparting a brownish-olive color to algae.
Fucoxanthin has a highly unique structure that contains both an epoxide bond and hydroxyl groups along with an allenic bond (two adjacent carbon-carbon double bonds) and a conjugated carbonyl group (carbon-oxygen double bond) in the polyene chain. All of these features provide fucoxanthin with powerful antioxidant activity.

In macroalgal plastids, fucoxanthin acts like an antenna for light harvesting and energy transfer in the photosystem light harvesting complexes. In diatoms like Phaeodactylum tricornutum, fucoxanthin is protein-bound along with chlorophyll to form a light harvesting protein complex. Fucoxanthin is the dominant carotenoid, responsible for up to 60% of the energy transfer to chlorophyll a in diatoms  When bound to protein, the absorption spectrum of fucoxanthin expands from 450-540 nm to 390-580 nm, a range that is useful in aquatic environments.

Sources 
Fucoxanthin is present in brown seaweeds and diatoms and was first isolated from Fucus, Dictyota, and Laminaria by Willstätter and Page in 1914. Seaweeds are commonly consumed in south-east Asia and certain countries in Europe, while diatoms are single-cell planktonic microalgae characterized by a golden-brown color, due to their high content of Fucoxanthin. Generally, diatoms contain up to 4 times more Fucoxanthin than seaweed, making diatoms a viable source for fucoxanthin industrially.  Diatoms can be grown in controlled environments (such as photobioreactors).  Brown seaweeds are mostly grown in the open sea, often exposed to metals and metalloids.

Potential therapeutic applications 

Fucoxanthin has been shown to induce G1 cell-cycle arrest and apoptosis in various cancer cell lines and tumor growth in animal models of cancer. Fucoxanthin also reduces weight, improves blood lipid profiles, and decreased insulin resistance in animal models of obesity. In a human clinical trial Fucoxanthin was shown to improve weight parameters in slightly obese Japanese subjects. Applications regarding diabetes are suggested by some research. In nonclinical assessments, fucoxanthin showed the capacity to notably inhibit the growth of Mycobacterium tuberculosis. Its mechanism of action was found to be correlated to the ability to inactivate two vital enzymes that play a significant role in mycobacterial cell wall biosynthesis namely UDP-galactopyranose mutase (UGM) and arylamine-N-acetyltransferase (TBNAT).

Bioavailability and safety  

Limited studies of the bioavailability of fucoxanthin in humans suggest that it is low but might be improved through formulation. In rodents, fucoxanthin displays low toxicity when administered orally.  While human safety data is limited, the FDA has acknowledged the use of Fucoxanthin as a dietary supplement and filled a New Dietary Ingredient (NDI) notification of Fucoxanthin derived from the microalgae Phaeodactylum tricornutum.

See also 
Chlorophyll

References

Other studies 
 

Carotenoids
Epoxides
Brown algae
Diatom biology